The Timberline Cabin in Rocky Mountain National Park, Colorado, USA was built in 1925 to house workers on the Fall River Road. The National Park Service rustic style cabin was designed by the National Park Service's Landscape Engineering Division under the direction of Thomas Chalmers Vint. The cabin was later used as a patrol cabin and as a caretaker's residence.

The one-story cabin stood above the timberline. It was built of concrete with a stone veneer. The roof framing used peeled logs with an asphalt roll roofing weather surface, protected by a log lattice on top.

The Timberline Cabin was placed on the National Register of Historic Places on January 29, 1988.  It has since been demolished.

See also
National Register of Historic Places listings in Grand County, Colorado
National Register of Historic Places listings in Rocky Mountain National Park

References

Park buildings and structures on the National Register of Historic Places in Colorado
National Register of Historic Places in Rocky Mountain National Park
National Park Service rustic in Colorado
Residential buildings completed in 1925
Buildings and structures in Grand County, Colorado
National Register of Historic Places in Grand County, Colorado
1925 establishments in Colorado